Palpita parvifraterna is a moth in the family Crambidae. It was described by Inoue in 1999. It is found in China (Fujian, Jiangxi, Henan, Hubei, Guangdong, Guangxi, Sichuan, Guizhou, Hong Kong).

References

Moths described in 1999
Palpita
Moths of Asia